The League Championship Series Most Valuable Player (MVP) Award is given annually to the Major League Baseball (MLB) players deemed to have the most impact on their teams' performances in each of the two respective League Championship Series that comprise the penultimate round of the MLB postseason. The award is given separately for a player in both the American League Championship Series and the National League Championship Series. It has been presented in the National League (NL) since 1977, and in the American League (AL) since 1980. Dusty Baker won the inaugural award in 1977 with the Los Angeles Dodgers, and Frank White won the first AL award in 1980 with the Kansas City Royals. The ten Hall of Famers to win LCS MVPs include Roberto Alomar, George Brett, Dennis Eckersley, Rickey Henderson, Kirby Puckett, Ozzie Smith, Willie Stargell, John Smoltz, Iván Rodríguez, and Mariano Rivera.

Three players have won the award twice: Steve Garvey (1978, 1984), Dave Stewart (1990, 1993), and Orel Hershiser (1988, 1995). Incidentally, all three of these players won their two awards with two different teams. Seven players have gone on to win the World Series MVP Award in the same season in which they won the LCS MVP—all of them in the NL. Three players have won while playing for the losing team in the series: Fred Lynn played for the 1982 California Angels; Mike Scott pitched for the 1986 Houston Astros; and Jeffrey Leonard played for the 1987 San Francisco Giants. Two players have shared the award in the same year three times, all in the NL; Rob Dibble and Randy Myers for the 1990 Cincinnati Reds, the Chicago Cubs' Jon Lester and Javier Báez in 2016, and Chris Taylor and Justin Turner of the Los Angeles Dodgers in 2017.

Garvey, Leonard, Albert Pujols, and Randy Arozarena hit four home runs in their winning series—Garvey in his first win. Adam Kennedy won the 2002 ALCS MVP when he hit 3 home runs in 1 game; he had hit 7 during the regular season and hit 80 in his 14-year career. David Ortiz had 11 runs batted in (RBIs) during the 2004 ALCS and Iván Rodríguez had 10 during the 2003 NLCS—the only two players to reach double-digit RBIs in the series in the history of the award. From the pitcher's mound, Steve Avery threw  innings without giving up a run in the 1991 NLCS, and John Smoltz amassed 19 strikeouts the following year. Liván Hernández won the 1997 NLCS MVP after winning his only start and earning a win out of the bullpen in relief; he struck out 16 in  innings. Daniel Murphy won the 2015 NLCS MVP after hitting home runs in six consecutive games, setting a major league record.

Liván Hernández (1997, NL) and his half-brother Orlando Hernández (1999, AL) are the only family pair to have won the award. The only rookies to have won the award are Mike Boddicker (1983, AL), Liván Hernández (1997, NL), Michael Wacha (2013, NL), Randy Arozarena (2020, AL) and Jeremy Peña (2022, AL).

Key

American League winners

National League winners

References
General

Inline citations

Further reading

External links
Playoff and World Series Stats at Baseball-Reference

 
 
MVP
MVP
Major League Baseball lists
Major League Baseball trophies and awards
Most valuable player awards
NLCS MVP
ALCS MVP